Frédéric Bazille at his Easel is an 1867 oil on canvas painting by Auguste Renoir, produced in response to Frédéric Bazille's own 1867 portrait of Renoir. It is owned by the Musée d'Orsay , which has deposited it at the Musée Fabre in Montpellier, Bazille's birthplace.

Gallery

References

External links 
 Catalogue entry, Musée d'Orsay

Bibliography 
 Francesca Castellani (trad. Marie-Christine Gamberini), Renoir : sa vie, son œuvre [« Renoir »], Paris, Gründ, 1996, 272 p.. 
 Anne Distel, Renoir : « Il faut embellir », Paris, Gallimard, coll. « Découvertes Gallimard / Arts » (nº 177), 2009, 175 p..r

19th-century portraits
Bazille
1867 paintings
Paintings in the collection of the Musée Fabre
Paintings in the collection of the Musée d'Orsay
Portraits of men
Paintings about painting